Andrew Caldwell is an American actor. He is known for his starring roles in the 2008 film College and the 2013 film Geography Club, and for his appearances in television series such as Henry Danger and iZombie.

Career
Caldwell appeared on Hannah Montana in its second season in the recurring role of Thor, a new kid from Minnesota that Jackson befriends, in 2007. He played the bully, Bubba Bixby, in the 2007 Nickelodeon movie, Shredderman Rules. He  provided the voice of Howard Weinerman on the 2012–2015 Disney XD animated series Randy Cunningham: 9th Grade Ninja.

Caldwell has had small roles in several films, including Transformers and Drillbit Taylor starring Owen Wilson. He had a starring role in the 2008 comedy film College alongside Drake Bell. Caldwell co-starred in the 2013 independent teen comedy Geography Club.

In late 2016 Caldwell was cast in a recurring role on the third season of the CW television series iZombie, playing the role of Harley Jones an anti-government extremist.

Filmography

Film

Television

References

External links
 
 

Living people
People from Grand Blanc, Michigan
American male child actors
American male film actors
American male television actors
21st-century American male actors
Year of birth missing (living people)